The Hedong Bridge is a cable stayed bridge located in Guangzhou, Guangdong, China. The bridge carries traffic between Liwan District, west of the river and Haizhu District to the east.

The bridge's daily traffic is 130,000 cars.

In 2021, construction work on the bridge consisted in the replacement of 144 stay cables, the layout of 40,000 square meters of noise-reducing pavement, and the application of anti-corrosion coating.

References

Cable-stayed bridges in China
Bridges in Guangzhou
Bridges over the Pearl River (China)
Bridges completed in 1998